"Simple Life" is a song recorded by Canadian country music singer Carolyn Dawn Johnson.  It was released in November 2003 as the third single from her album Dress Rehearsal.  The song was also her fifth entry on two U.S. singles charts, peaking at number 13 on Billboard Hot Country Singles & Tracks (now Hot Country Songs) and number 73 on the Billboard Hot 100.  The song was written by  Troy Verges, Aimee Mayo, Chris Lindsey and Hillary Lindsey.

Critical reception
Deborah Evans Price, of Billboard magazine reviewed the song favorably, saying that the production has an "earthy, organic feel, infused with dobro, mandolin and some tasty guitar work." She calls Johnson's voice "effervescent" and "full of passion and verve."

Music video
The music video was directed by Steven Goldmann and premiered in early 2004.

Chart positions
"Simple Life" debuted at number 55 on the U.S. Billboard Hot Country Singles & Tracks for the week of November 29, 2003.

Year-end charts

References

2003 singles
2003 songs
Carolyn Dawn Johnson songs
Song recordings produced by Dann Huff
Songs written by Chris Lindsey
Songs written by Hillary Lindsey
Songs written by Aimee Mayo
Songs written by Troy Verges
Arista Nashville singles
Music videos directed by Steven Goldmann